The Sandie Shaw Supplement was a television show hosted by the British singer Sandie Shaw in 1968; and also the name of her fourth original album released in November of that year by Pye Records, and re-issued shortly afterwards on the Marble Arch label. The TV show included Shaw singing the songs from the album.

Most of the shows have since been erased by the BBC, after Shaw asked for them to put the film on videotape. Only two episodes (episodes 2 & 3) have survived, after being returned to the BBC from overseas in the early 1990s. Episode 2 was shown on BBC2 shortly after being recovered. The audio tracks to some episodes have survived and pirate versions can sometimes be found on the internet but are generally hard to find.

Television episodes
Broadcast Tuesdays on BBC1 at 9:55pm, with the exception of episode 6 broadcast at 11:00pm.

Episode 2 was repeated on BBC2 Monday, 30 August 1993 and on BBC Four Saturday, 25 April 2009.

Album track listing 
 "(Get Your Kicks On) Route 66" (Bobby Troup)
 "Homeward Bound" (Paul Simon)
 "Scarborough Fair" (Art Garfunkel, Paul Simon)
 "Right to Cry" (Gerry Goffin, Carole King)
 "The Same Things" (Chris Andrews)
 "Our Song of Love" (Bill Martin, Phil Coulter)
 "(I Can't Get No) Satisfaction" (Mick Jagger, Keith Richards)
 "Words" (Barry Gibb, Robin Gibb, Maurice Gibb)
 "Remember Me" (Chris Andrews)
 "Change of Heart" (Carole Bayer, Toni Wine)
 "Aranjuez Mon Amour" (Joaquín Rodrigo)
 "What Now My Love" (Carl Sigman, Gilbert Bécaud, Pierre Delanoë)

References

External links

BBC Television shows
1968 albums
Sandie Shaw albums
Pye Records albums